The Manawatu Plains is an area of low-lying land in New Zealand, located on the floodplains of the Manawatu and Rangitikei Rivers. It is some of the most fertile lands in the southwestern North Island.

Stretching from the northern Horowhenua around Levin in the south to Marton in the north, the triangular area of land extends inland from the South Taranaki Bight to almost as far as Ashhurst at the mouth of the Manawatu Gorge.

In the south, around Lake Horowhenua, the plains were once an extensive wetland, which has been largely drained and turned into profitable dairy farming land. There are conservation moves in progress to restore some of these wetlands to their former state.

Further north, the plains provide the basis for the economy which drives the city of Palmerston North and the towns of Foxton, Feilding, and Bulls, all of which rely on the agricultural dollar to an extent.

As floodplains, the land is not always entirely dry. Although the area receives slightly below the national average rainfall, floods can occur, as happened around the township of Tangimoana in early 2004.

Landforms of Manawatū-Whanganui
Plains of New Zealand
Floodplains of Oceania
Wetlands of New Zealand